Mary Biddinger (born May 14, 1974, in Fremont, California) is an American poet, editor, and academic.

Biography 
Mary Biddinger received an Honors B.A. in English with a Creative Writing Subconcentration from the University of Michigan.  She also holds an MFA in Poetry from Bowling Green State University, and a Ph.D. in English with Creative Dissertation from the University of Illinois at Chicago.

Biddinger is the author of the poetry collections Prairie Fever (Steel Toe Books, 2007), Saint Monica (Black Lawrence Press, 2011), O Holy Insurgency (Black Lawrence Press, 2013), and A Sunny Place with Adequate Water (Black Lawrence Press, 2014).  Her poems have appeared in numerous literary magazines, including Copper Nickel, Crazyhorse, Guernica, Gulf Coast, The Iowa Review, 32 poems, Ninth Letter, North American Review, Ploughshares, and Third Coast. Biddinger is the recipient of a 2015 National Endowment for the Arts Creative Writing Fellowship in poetry.

She is a professor in the Department of English  at the University of Akron, and was Director of the NEOMFA: Northeast Ohio Master of Fine Arts in Creative Writing program from 2009 to 2012.  Biddinger teaches courses in poetry writing, craft and theory of poetry, and literature.

Biddinger is the Editor of the Akron Series in Poetry, which sponsors the annual Akron Poetry Prize and publishes three poetry collections every year.   Biddinger also serves as co-editor, with John Gallaher, of the Akron Series in Contemporary Poetics at the University of Akron Press. The first volume, titled The Monkey and the Wrench: Essays into Contemporary Poetics, was published in January, 2011.

In 2007, Biddinger founded Barn Owl Review, an independent literary magazine published in Akron, Ohio.

Awards 
 National Endowment for the Arts Creative Writing Fellowship in Poetry (2015)
 Two Ohio Arts Council Individual Creativity Excellence Awards
 Illinois Arts Council Literary Award (2005)
 Buchtel College of Arts and Sciences Service Award (2008)

Works
 Prairie Fever, 2007, Steel Toe Books
 Saint Monica, 2011, Black Lawrence Press
 O Holy Insurgency, 2013, Black Lawrence Press
 A Sunny Place with Adequate Water, 2014, Black Lawrence Press
Small Enterprise, 2015, Black Lawrence Press
The Czar (with Jay Robinson), 2016, Black Lawrence Press
Partial Genius,  2019, Black Lawrence Press
Department of Elegy, 2022, Black Lawrence Press

References

External links 
 Mary Biddinger's poem "Risk Management Memo: Small Enterprise" in Gulf Coast: A Journal of Literature and Fine Arts (25.1).
 Mary Biddinger's Website
 Biddinger's profile on the University of Akron Website
 Biddinger's profile at the NEOMFA Website
 Biddinger's profile at Poets & Writers

1974 births
Living people
Poets from California
Bowling Green State University alumni
Cleveland State University people
University of Akron faculty
University of Illinois Chicago alumni
University of Michigan College of Literature, Science, and the Arts alumni
American women poets
21st-century American poets
American women academics
21st-century American women writers